Aconbury is a village in the English county of Herefordshire, situated on a road between Hereford and Ross-on-Wye.

St John the Baptist Church was originally the church of a nunnery founded before 1237. The style of the current building is late 13th-century.  Some restoration work was carried out in 1863 by Sir George Gilbert Scott. According to local legend, a phantom monk was once exorcised into a bottle, which is now buried in the wall of the church.

On nearby Aconbury Hill is an Iron Age hillfort, Aconbury Camp.

References

External links

Villages in Herefordshire